The Battle of Kovanbaşı was a battle between Turkish National Forces and the French Third Republic during the Franco-Turkish War. The battle ended with a Turkish victory on 11 October 1920.

Background 
French interest in the region sparked by the Sykes-Picot Agreement, signed amidst World War I.

Battle 
Battle of Kovanbaşı was the first one of 2 major battles in Osmaniye Province during the Franco-Turkish War. The battle started on 10 October when French artillery fired several fires against Turkish targets. As a respond, Turkish troops marched to the French positions and French forces retreated. Then French moved their troops in Düziçi to the battlefront in Kovanbaşı but was defeated again. After 8 hours of fighting, all French and Armenian troops in region retreated to northern Ceyhan with heavy casualties, around 1000.

Aftermath 
After the battle, Battle of Kanlı Geçit was fought in November and resulted in Turkish victory, forcing French to fully retreat from Osmaniye Province.

References 

October 1920 events
Kovanbaşı
1920 in the Ottoman Empire
1920 in France
Conflicts in 1920